Cristian Neptalí Cálix Alvarado (born 9 September 1999) is a Honduran professional footballer who plays as a midfielder for Liga Nacional club Olancho FC.

Club career

Marathón
Born in Juticalpa, Olancho, Cálix is the youngest of five brothers. At the age of 13, he decided to try his luck and pursue a footballing career in San Pedro Sula, where he joined the youth setup of C.D. Marathón. On 29 April 2017, Cálix made his senior debut for Marathón in the Liga Nacional de Fútbol Profesional de Honduras at the age of 17, coming off the bench in a 2–1 home victory over C.D.S. Vida in the Clausura tournament. The following season, Cálix appeared regularly for Marathón, and his first senior goal eventually came on 17 September 2017 in a 3–2 home win against C.D. Olimpia. He would add a further two goals that campaign in matches against Motagua and Honduras Progreso, as his side won the 2018 Clausura tournament.

Atlas
On 27 December 2018, Atlas F.C. announced the transfer of Cálix from Marathón. He signed a four-year contract with Los Rojinegros, but was assigned to the under-20 team after a delay in his registration. Once he was finally registered, Cálix was included the squad list for the Liga MX match against Club Puebla. He was a unused substitute in a 2–1 home loss. He spent the rest of the season with the U–20 side, playing nine matches and scoring one goal.

Loan to Real Monarchs
On 9 July 2019, USL Championship side Real Monarchs announced the loan signing of Cálix for the remainder of the season. He made his debut – off the bench – in a 4–1 win against Tulsa Roughnecks FC, replacing Luis Arriaga in the 82nd minute. He scored his first goal the following 17 September in another 4–1 win, this time against Tacoma Defiance away from home. Cálix returned to Atlas after Real Monarchs opted not to trigger the buy-option in his contract.

Return to Marathón
On 6 January 2020, Cálix returned to C.D. Marathón, signing with the Esmeraldas on a year-long loan. He played the first match of his second spell the following 23 February, coming on as a second-half substitute in a 5–0 away defeat to Olimpia. The following season, Cálix scored the opening goal in a 3–0 home victory against Real España on 14 October 2020.

International career
In July 2018, Cálix was called up to represent his nation at the 2018 Central American and Caribbean Games in Colombia. He played in every match at the tournament and he opened the scoring in the third place match against Haiti, where he helped his side win 3–0 and take home bronze.

The following year, Cálix represented Honduras at the 2019 FIFA U-20 World Cup in Poland. He would only play in two matches, as Honduras were eliminated in the group stage.

In June 2021, he was included in the preliminary 60-man Honduras squad for the 2021 CONCACAF Gold Cup, but was dropped from the final squad.

Honors
Marathón
Liga Nacional: 2018 Clausura
Honduran Cup: 2017

Real Monarchs
USL Championship: 2019

References

External links
 
 

1999 births
Living people
People from Olancho Department
Honduran footballers
Association football midfielders
C.D. Marathón players
Atlas F.C. footballers
Real Monarchs players
Liga Nacional de Fútbol Profesional de Honduras players
USL Championship players
Competitors at the 2018 Central American and Caribbean Games
Central American and Caribbean Games bronze medalists for Honduras
Honduran expatriate footballers
Honduran expatriate sportspeople in Mexico
Honduran expatriate sportspeople in the United States
Expatriate footballers in Mexico
Expatriate soccer players in the United States
Honduras youth international footballers
Honduras under-20 international footballers